In neurobiology, a tetanic stimulation consists of a high-frequency sequence of individual stimulations of a neuron. It is associated with potentiation.

High-frequency stimulation causes an increase in release called post-tetanic potentiation (Kandel 2003). This presynaptic event is caused by calcium influx. Calcium-protein interactions then produce a change in vesicle exocytosis. The result of these changes is to make the postsynaptic cell more likely to fire an action potential. 

Tetanic stimulation is used in medicine to detect a non-depolarizing block or a depolarizing block on the neuromuscular junction. Lower elicitations of tetanic stimulation in aged muscles were shown to be caused by lower levels of anaerobic energy provision in skeletal muscles.

See also
 Hebbian theory

References

Neurophysiologists

de:Tetanisierung